Leung Bo Yee (born 21 November 1993) is a Hong Kong road and track cyclist, who most recently rode for UCI Women's Continental Team . She represented her nation at the 2015 UCI Track Cycling World Championships, and in the Madison at the 2020 Summer Olympics.

Major results
Source: 

2010
 3rd  Individual pursuit, Asian Junior Cycling Championships
2011
 Asian Junior Cycling Championships
1st  Road race
2nd  Time trial
3rd  Individual pursuit
2012
 2nd Road race, National Road Championships
 5th Time trial, Asian Road Championships
2013
 6th Overall Tour of Thailand
2014
 Track Clubs ACC Cup
1st Scratch
2nd Points race
 Hong Kong International Track Cup
2nd Individual pursuit
3rd Scratch
 3rd Road race, National Road Championships
2015
 2nd  Team pursuit, Asian Track Championships (with Meng Zhaojuan, Pang Yao and Yang Qianyu)
 3rd Time trial, National Road Championships
2016
 1st Team pursuit, Track Clubs ACC Cup (with Leung Wing Yee, Pang Yao and Yang Qianyu)
 1st Team pursuit, Track Asia Cup (with Leung Wing Yee, Pang Yao and Meng Zhaojuan)
 National Road Championships
2nd Time trial
3rd Road race
2017
 2nd  Team pursuit, Asian Track Championships (with Diao Xiaojuan, Pang Yao and Yang Qianyu)
 2nd Time trial, National Road Championships
2019
 2020 Asian Track Cycling Championships
2nd  Individual pursuit
3rd  Points race

References

External links
 

1993 births
Hong Kong female cyclists
Living people
Cyclists at the 2014 Asian Games
Cyclists at the 2018 Asian Games
Asian Games competitors for Hong Kong
Cyclists at the 2020 Summer Olympics
Olympic cyclists of Hong Kong